Christian Blandon (born October 2, 1992) is a Colombian-American professional footballer who is a current member of the United States national beach soccer team. He plays as a defender/midfielder.

Career

College and Youth
Blandon played four years of college soccer at Creighton University between 2011 and 2014.

While at college, Blandon also appeared for USL PDL club VSI Tampa Flames and Ocala Stampede.

Professional
On March 30, 2015, Blandon signed with North American Soccer League side Fort Lauderdale Strikers. Following the 2016 North American Soccer League season, Blandon began playing indoor soccer with the Major Arena Soccer League's Florida Tropics SC. On November 18, 2016, Blandon was officially released by the Strikers.

September 18, 2017 called up to the US National Beach soccer team and on October 20, 2017 makes he's first international debut against France in a 6–5 win in Puerta Vallarta Cup in Mexico.

References

External links 
 Florida Tropics SC profile

1992 births
Living people
Colombian footballers
Colombian expatriate footballers
Soccer players from Minnesota
Creighton Bluejays men's soccer players
VSI Tampa Bay FC (PDL) players
Ocala Stampede players
Fort Lauderdale Strikers players
Association football midfielders
Expatriate soccer players in the United States
USL League Two players
North American Soccer League players
Major Arena Soccer League players
Florida Tropics SC players
American beach soccer players
Footballers from Cali